Sun Hai Tao is a paralympic athlete from China competing mainly in category F12 throws events.

Sun Hai Tao is a six time gold medalist at the Paralympics, winning gold medals at each of his three paralympics.  He first competed in the 1996 Summer Paralympics with a clean sweep of gold medals in the F12 throws events with wins in discus, javelin and shot as well as competing as part of the Chinese 4 × 100 m relay team.  He returned in 2000 Summer Paralympics but was not as successful only managing to retain the shot put gold medal while winning silver in the discus and bronze in the shot put.  But he managed to come back stronger in the 2004 Summer Paralympics winning gold in the discus and shot put but for the first time in an individual event he missed out on a medal in the javelin.

References

External links
 

Year of birth missing (living people)
Living people
Chinese male sprinters
Chinese male shot putters
Chinese male discus throwers
Chinese male javelin throwers
Paralympic athletes of China
Paralympic gold medalists for China
Paralympic silver medalists for China
Paralympic bronze medalists for China
Paralympic medalists in athletics (track and field)
Athletes (track and field) at the 1996 Summer Paralympics
Athletes (track and field) at the 2000 Summer Paralympics
Athletes (track and field) at the 2004 Summer Paralympics
Medalists at the 1996 Summer Paralympics
Medalists at the 2000 Summer Paralympics
Medalists at the 2004 Summer Paralympics
Visually impaired sprinters
Visually impaired shot putters
Visually impaired discus throwers
Visually impaired javelin throwers
Paralympic sprinters
Paralympic shot putters
Paralympic discus throwers
Paralympic javelin throwers